'An admiration in the field of Engineering education, Joginpally B.R.Engineering College, a part of the visionary Sri J.Bhaskaro Rao's accomplishment, observed its inception in the year 2002 with the lofty aim of providing quality professional education and meeting the rising expectations of the student community in India.JBREC (Joginpally B.R. Engineering College) is an engineering college in Hyderabad which is affiliated to JNTU . It was established in 2002 by Sri. J. Bhaskar Rao. It is best for excellence in technology and infrastructure. The college is approved by All India Council for Technical Education (AICTE) and permanently affiliated with Jawaharlal Nehru Technological University, Hyderabad.EAMCET CODE: JOGI'' .

General information 
It has an intake of more than 700 students. Being established in the early years of the 21st century, the college's faculty includes many Ph.D holders.

Location and campus 
Nestled in the woods on the outskirts of Hyderabad.

History 
J. B. Educational Society was formed in 1993 by J. Bhaskar Rao to provide professional education in English. JBREC was sponsored and established by J.B.R. Educational Society. It is recognized by AICTE and affiliated to JNTU.

Facilities

Library 
The college library has around 2000 old books & 2 new books relevant to the student's fields of study.  The library has subscriptions to new papers.  Books of general interest and dictionaries of the disciplines are not given to students for reference.

Health– Center 
JBIET has a health center that provides first-aid and medical kits along with the guidance of a medical assistant. The institution has as a Memorandum of Understanding (MOU) with Bhaskar General Hospital(established by J.B.Group of Management) for medical and diagnostic services both as outpatients and inpatients.

Street Cause - an NGO 
The college also has a few of its students being very active in carrying out regular social events, through a very famous organization called 'Street Cause'. Every month, the students have a schedule chalked out and events are conducted. These events aim at tackling social issues in the society. Some of the events include, visiting orphanages and interacting with the children there, providing amenities to the down-trodden and regular distribution of food.

Student Activity Centre (SAC) 
The college has a Student Activity Centre which is totally student-oriented. It is governed by the students studying in the college and is mainly concerned with the organizational activities of fests in the college. This centre is where students organize meetings to come to a consensus.

Sports
In JBREC, students are encouraged to involve in physical activity either in college or off-site. Sports room is available for students for various recreational activities. Team games are offered along with other sports. Sports events are conducted on a regular basis to promote various sports.

External links
 JBREC Official website

Engineering colleges in Hyderabad, India
2002 establishments in Andhra Pradesh
Educational institutions established in 2002